Sabrina Nicole Thompson (born April 9, 1985) is an American aerospace engineer. As Flight Dynamics Lead Analyst at NASA Goddard Space Flight Center, Thompson has developed orbits and trajectories for various NASA missions and mission concepts. She founded a fashion brand, named Girl in Space Club, which garnered press coverage in 2022 on its projects to develop flight suits and space suits for female astronauts.

Early life and education 
Sabrina Nicole Thompson was born on April 9, 1985, in Roosevelt, New York. Thompson was raised in Roosevelt and attended Roosevelt Public Schools from pre-kindergarten through high school. Her mother was a nurse and her father was a charter bus driver; she remembers her parents and grandmother inspired an "I-can-do-anything attitude" in her growing up. A player on the girls' varsity basketball team in high school, Thompson admired the athletes Cynthia Cooper, Teresa Edwards, and Teresa Weatherspoon and desired to become an artist or basketball player when she became older. She did not know what engineers were until her final year in high school. Later, she remarked that although her school district "didn't have the resources like the other schools on Long Island, I learned a lot. My teachers would do everything they could to get me harder work just to prepare me and help me." By the end of high school, Thompson chose to study engineering at university, after her art teacher recommended she study the subject since she excelled in math and science.

Thompson graduated from high school as co-valedictorian of her class in 2003 and chose to attend the State University of New York at Stony Brook to study mechanical engineering. During her undergraduate studies from 2003 to 2007, she completed summer internships at the American Honda Motor Co., Brookhaven National Laboratory, and a local product design firm. From 2007 to 2009, she attended the Georgia Institute of Technology for a master's degree in aerospace engineering and during this time interned at NASA Glenn Research Center in Ohio.

Career 

In 2010, Thompson was hired as a safety engineer at NASA Goddard Space Flight Center, in Greenbelt, Maryland, and worked in the facility's Occupational Safety and Health Division. She first met meteorologist and astronaut Piers Sellers, whom she considers a mentor, during a leadership development program at NASA Goddard and later said he "started me on the path to study atmospheric physics". She later moved to the Navigation and Mission Design Branch at NASA Goddard and worked as a Navigation & Mission Design Engineer. In this position, she worked on trajectories, orbit analysis, and mission design for spaceflight missions using CubeSats; research and development on using CubeSats for deep space missions; and flight dynamics of satellites in the Magnetospheric Multiscale Mission. She later earned a second graduate degree from the University of Maryland, Baltimore County (UMBC) and has pursued a PhD in atmospheric physics at the institution since 2017.

With UMBC professor Vanderlei Martins, Thompson worked on the Hyper-Angular Rainbow Polarimeter (HARP) CubeSat that launched from the International Space Station in 2020. HARP2, a copy of HARP with updated instrumentation, is set to be launched on the NASA satellite Plankton, Aerosol, Cloud, ocean Ecosystem (PACE) by December 2023 at the earliest. In 2021 and 2022, it was reported that Thompson was developing "swarms" of small satellites that can communicate with one another and obtain data on weather patterns at varied times and points of observation.

Thompson has spoken with students at educational institutions for the occasions of Black History Month and Engineers Week, recruited for her employer at colleges, and spoken at events which aim to educate youth about the fields of science, technology, engineering, and mathematics (STEM). She was vice president of the local Greenbelt Space Chapter of the National Society of Black Engineers in her initial years at NASA Goddard.

Thompson told Women's Wear Daily in 2022 that she had applied to the NASA astronaut program two times, including once in 2020, and that she plans to reapply in 2024.

Girl in Space Club 
In 2018, Thompson created a direct-to-consumer streetwear brand named Girl in Space Club. She founded the fashion brand with the aim of making STEM "fun and fashionable", as she felt the "artist inside of me was internally starving" despite being satisfied with her career. The brand began to be profitable in 2020 through online and pop-up sales and its products in 2022 included jean jackets, T-shirts, and digital prints.

In 2022, its projects to design a flight suit and a pressurized space suit for female astronauts were covered by Women's Wear Daily and CNBC. That year Thompson said the space suit was in the "research and design phase" and that she was in the "early stages" of meeting with collaborators and seeking investors and grants for funding. She plans to make the flight suit available for purchase for $600.

Thompson plans to create a nonprofit arm of Girl in Space Club to mentor high school girls interested in STEM fields using art and fashion.

References 

1985 births
Living people
People from Roosevelt, New York
NASA people
Engineers from New York (state)
Women aerospace engineers
African-American women scientists
Stony Brook University alumni
Georgia Tech alumni
21st-century American women scientists
21st-century African-American scientists
21st-century African-American women
Articles containing video clips
21st-century American engineers
American aerospace engineers